Caucaus Front (or Caucasian Front) may have one of the following meanings
Caucasus Front (Russian Republic), the designation for the main army of the Russian Republic (successor to the Caucasus Army of the Imperial Russian Army) in the Caucasus in World War I from April 1917 until its dissolution
Caucasian Front (RSFSR) (1920-1921), a front of the Red Army during the Russian Civil War
Soviet Caucasian Front, Soviet army group of World War II
Caucasian Front (militant group), Islamist separatist unit during the Second Chechen War, active in 2005–2007

See also
Russian Caucasus Army, a variety of Russian military formations, 18th to 21st century
Caucasus Campaign, the military campaign that took place in the Caucasus during World War I
North Caucasian Front, a Front (military subdivision) of the Soviet Army during the World War II
Transcaucasian Front, another Front of the Soviet Army during the World War II